52nd Regiment of Foot may refer to:

50th (Queen's Own) Regiment of Foot, raised in 1755 and renumbered as the 50th in 1756
52nd (Oxfordshire) Regiment of Foot, raised as the 54th and renumbered in 1756

See also

52nd Lowland Regiment, a Territorial Army regiment formed in 1999